Bavaleh (also Romanized as Bāvaleh; also known as Bāvaleh-ye Fa‘leh Korī and Bāwali) is a village in Bavaleh Rural District, in the Central District of Sonqor County, Kermanshah Province, Iran. At the 2006 census, its population was 1,320, in 299 families.

References 

Populated places in Sonqor County